Ernesto Pascal (1865–1940) was an Italian mathematician.

Life and work 
Pascal graduated in mathematics from the university of Naples in 1887. In the following two years he attended courses in the universities of Pisa and Göttingen; in the last one Pascal studied under Felix Klein who influenced him. From 1890 to 1907 he was teaching at the university of Pavia and in 1907 he returned to the university of Naples were he taught until his death. Here, as Dean of the Faculty of Sciences he reorganised the teaching of mathematics, creating for each professorship a laboratory equipped with models and instruments.

Pascal was remembered for his work on elliptic functions based on Jacobi theta function.

References

Bibliography

External links 
 
 
 

1865 births
1940 deaths
19th-century Italian mathematicians
20th-century Italian mathematicians
University of Naples Federico II alumni
Giornale di matematiche editors